DXJP-TV, known as ETC-27 Zamboanga, DXJP-TV, channel 27 is an affiliate/relay television station of ETC. The studios & transmitter located at Zamboanga City.

Currently, ETC Channel 27 Zamboanga is inactive.

See also
 Southern Broadcasting Network

References

Television stations in Zamboanga City
Southern Broadcasting Network
ETC (Philippine TV channel) stations